The Anglican Diocese of Ekiti West is one of twelve within the Anglican Province of Ondo, itself one of 14 provinces within the Church of Nigeria: the inaugural bishop was Samuel Oke and the current incumbent is Rufus Victor Ajileye Adepoju. Adepoju was elected coadjutor and consecrated a bishop on 7 May 2017 at the.

References

Church of Nigeria dioceses
Dioceses of the Province of Ondo